Scyphophorus is a genus of snout and bark beetles in the family Dryophthoridae. There are about 11 described species in Scyphophorus.

Species
These 11 species belong to the genus Scyphophorus:
 Scyphophorus acupunctatus Gyllenhal, 1838 (sisal weevil)
 Scyphophorus anthracinus Gyllenhal, 1838
 Scyphophorus asperulus Csiki & E., 1936
 Scyphophorus fahraei Champion & G.C., 1910
 Scyphophorus fossionis Scudder, 1893
 Scyphophorus interstitialis Gyllenhal, 1838
 Scyphophorus lacordairei Chevrolat & L.A.A., 1882
 Scyphophorus laevis Scudder, 1893
 Scyphophorus robustior Horn & G.H., 1873
 Scyphophorus tertiarius Wickham & H.F., 1911
 Scyphophorus yuccae Horn, 1873

References

Further reading

External links

 

Dryophthorinae
Articles created by Qbugbot